Phil Davis (born 30 July 1953) is an English actor and director. His early work as a director earned awards for Life’s a Gas (1992) and ID (1995). As an actor, he starred in Quadrophenia (1979), The Bounty (1984), High Hopes (1988), The Firm (1989), In the Name of the Father (1993), North Square (2000), Vera Drake (2004), Bleak House (2005), Whitechapel (2009–2013), Sherlock and Brighton Rock (2010), Merlin (2011), and Silk (2012–2014), Poldark (2015), Mad Dogs (2015–2016), and Trying (2020-2022).

Early life
Davis was born in Highgate, London, and brought up in South Ockendon in Thurrock, Essex. His father worked for Procter & Gamble in a soap factory and his mother was a hospital dining room supervisor. From the age of eight, he was interested in acting. After failing his Eleven-plus, he attended Ockendon Courts County Secondary School in South Ockendon, Essex, where he was distracted in class,  although he enjoyed school plays. 

He was also a member of both the National Youth Theatre and Joan Littlewood's Theatre Workshop.

Career
In 1977, he was cast in the lead role of the play Gotcha! about an under-achieving student who holds two teachers hostage on his last day at school. An early film role was as Chalky, a mod who is knocked off his scooter by a rocker in Quadrophenia (1979). He then landed the role of midshipman Edward "Ned" Young in The Bounty (1984); co-star Daniel Day-Lewis later rated him as one of his greatest inspirations. He appeared in the TV series To Have and to Hold with Amanda Redman. He began a long association with Mike Leigh with roles including Cyril the motorcycle courier in High Hopes in 1988. In 1989, he starred opposite Gary Oldman in the BBC's football violence based film The Firm as 'Yeti', the rival gang leader to the protagonist. 

In 2004, davis palyed Stanley, the husband of the abortion care provider in Vera Drake (2004). He portrayed the mean money lender Smallweed in the BBC adaptation of Bleak House (2005), and as Jeff Hope, a cab driver in the first episode of Sherlock (2010). 

In 2012, he starred as crime family solicitor Micky Joy in Silk, then in 2015 as Jud, the malevolent servant in Poldark alongside Aidan Turner and Eleanor Tomlinson. 

In 2017, Davis played a main role as DI Ray Miles in the ITV1 four-part series Whitechapel starring alongside Rupert Penry Jones and Steve Pemberton. From November 2017 until February 2018, Davis played Ebenezer Scrooge in David Edgar's new adaptation of Charles Dickens' A Christmas Carol at the Royal Shakespeare Company.

Personal life
Davis married actress Eve Matheson in Hackney, London in 2002. They have a daughter, Amy Elisabeth (born 2002). Davis also has a son, Hugo (born 1996), by a previous partner.

Filmography

Recording career
In 1980, Davis recorded "Blown It", which was released on the Elton John-owned label The Rocket Record Company.

Awards and nominations

References

External links

1953 births
Living people
English male film actors
English film directors
English male television actors
English male voice actors
People from Grays, Essex
Rocket Records artists
21st-century English male actors
20th-century English male actors
Male actors from Essex
National Youth Theatre members